Franciszek Wilczkiewicz (10 October 1906 – 10 August 1968) was a Polish footballer. He played in two matches for the Poland national football team from 1931 to 1932.

References

External links
 

1906 births
1968 deaths
Polish footballers
Poland international footballers
Place of birth missing
Association footballers not categorized by position